Macrobathra equestris is a moth in the family Cosmopterigidae. It is found in India (Assam) and China.

References

Natural History Museum Lepidoptera generic names catalog

Macrobathra
Moths described in 1910